Sikasso Airport  is an airport serving Sikasso in Mali. A  dirt overrun on the west end of the gravel pavement appears usable.

See also
Transport in Mali

References

 OurAirports - Mali
   Great Circle Mapper - Sikasso
 Sikasso
 Google Earth

External links

 Google maps - old unused runway in Sikasso city

Airports in Mali